KQTZ (105.9 FM) is an American radio station licensed to serve the community of Hobart, Oklahoma. The station is currently owned and operated by James G Boles , Jr.

KQTZ, along with KWHW (1450 AM) and KRKZ (now KPRO, 93.5 FM), were acquired from Altus Radio, Inc., by Monarch Broadcasting in 2003. The stations, as well as translator K245CU were acquired by James G Boles , Jr. effective September 8, 2021.

KQTZ broadcasts a hot adult contemporary music format to the greater Lawton, Oklahoma, area. The station features programming from Citadel Media and Dial Global.

References

External links

QTZ
Radio stations established in 1979
Hot adult contemporary radio stations in the United States
Kiowa County, Oklahoma
1979 establishments in Oklahoma